Barton's thin-toed gecko (Mediodactylus bartoni) is a species of lizard in the family Gekkonidae. It is endemic to Crete and nearby islets. It is sometimes considered a subspecies of Kotschy's gecko.

References

Mediodactylus
Reptiles described in 1934